McCroskey is a surname. Notable people with the surname include:

People
Richard McCroskey, convicted of the Farmville murders, Virginia in 2009
Thomas J. McCroskey (1874–1948), Mayor of Anchorage, Alaska from 1933 to 1934
Virgil T. McCroskey (1876–1970), American conservationist

Fictional characters
Steve McCroskey, a character in the 1980 comedy film Airplane!, portrayed by Lloyd Bridges

See also
McCroskey State Park in Idaho, United States
McCarey (disambiguation)
McCloskey (disambiguation)
McCray (disambiguation)
McCrea (disambiguation)
McCrory (disambiguation)